</noinclude>
"I Cram to Understand U (Sam)" is the debut single by American rapper MC Lyte, in which features their DJ, DJ K-Rock, released in 1987. The song was part of her first album Lyte as a Rock, released the following year.

Produced by Milk Dee and DJ Gizmo from Audio Two, the song seeks to warn about the dangers of drug use and its impact on relationships.

In January 1998, the song was included on The Sources "The 100 Best Rap Singles of All Time" list.

Conception and composition 
"I Cram to Understand U (Sam)" was released in 1987 when Lyte was 16 years old, being the first recording released in her career. In it, she tells the story of meeting a man named Sam in 1981 who, while it seems he is cheating on her with another girl, turns out he is actually addicted to crack cocaine.

Considered by Mark Anthony Neal of PopMatters as one of the first songs about the crack era, it was written by Lyte at the age of 12.

In Brian Coleman's book Check the Technique, Lyte has stated regarding the song: "I mixed in elements of reality, but in 1981 I was eleven years old and wasn’t going anywhere near "Empire Boulevard". I didn’t go there until I was fourteen. It was a roller rink—every Sunday it was Hip hop. Kurtis Blow and New Edition performed there, but mostly it was just roller-skating and great music."

The song was mixed by then Stetsasonic frontman Daddy O.

Samples 
The song contains a sample of The Brothers Johnson's "Ain't We Funkin' Now". It also has an interpolation of "I'm in the Mood for Love" by Frances Langford, in which Lyte sings, "Look, I'm in the mood for love/Simply because you're near me."

Appearances
"I Cram to Understand U" was included on her compilation albums The Very Best of MC Lyte (2001), Rhyme Masters (2005), Cold Rock a Party - Best Of MC Lyte (2019) and on the EastWest Maxi-Single "Lyte Of A Decade" (1996).

An Audio Two remix with Ivan "Doc" Rodriguez, "I Cram to Understand U (1990 Remix)", was included on her later single "Cappucino" and on her fourth album Ain't No Other (1993).

Reception and influence
At the time of publication, Peter Watrous of The New York Times rated "I Cram to Understand U (Sam)" as one of the best 12-inch singles of the year, noting "Unlike the dozens of raps that are simply comic put-downs, Ms Lyte's plaintive tone and her self-deprecating story add up to a complex emotional statement." For his part, Mike Boehm of the Los Angeles Times would comment in 1990:

In January 1998 "I Cram to Understand U (Sam)" was included by The Source in their list "The 100 Best Rap Singles of All Time".

In 1999, Ego Trips editors ranked "I Cram to Understand U (Sam)" at  18 in their list of Hip Hop's 40 Greatest Singles by Year 1987 in Ego Trip's Book of Rap Lists.

In 2018, on the 30th anniversary of its release, Albumism'''s Jesse Ducker reviewed "Lyte as a Rock," in which he commented on the song:

Samples
MC Lyte herself has sampled the song in her collaboration with Sinéad O'Connor on "I Want Your (Hands on Me)" (Street Mix) (1988), on your diss track "Shut the Eff Up! (Hoe)" from her second album Eyes on This (1989) and on "King of Rock" from her sixth album Seven & Seven (1998). It has also been sampled/referenced by several other artists:

In 1992 Gang Starr sampled the song on the track "The Place Where We Dwell" from their album Daily Operation.
In August 1992 the song was sampled by Masta Ace Incorporated on their single "Jeep Ass Niguh" from their album SlaughtaHouse. The song was again sampled by Masta Ace in 2001 on "Dopes, Pushers, Addicts".
In December 1992 Positive K interpolated "I Cram to Understand U" on his hit I Got a Man. In the first verse, the female voice quote to the song singing "I'm not one of those girls that go rippin around".
In October 1996 "I Cram to Understand U" was interpolated by Nas on his single "Street Dreams" from his  album It Was Written. In the third verse he quotes the song saying "I knew the dopes, the pushers, the addicts, everybody"In 2000, the song was sampled by Prodigy on his single "Keep It Thoro" from his debut solo album H.N.I.C.In 2003 the song was interpolated by Missy Elliott on the track "Let It Bump" from her album This Is Not a Test! In the first verse, she refers to the beginning of the song saying "Remember when Lyte was in love wit Sam/I used to be in love wit this guy name Sam."In 2006, the song was sampled by Planet Asia on The Medicine'' on his track with Jonell "In Love With You".

Single track listing

7" Vinyl

A-Side
 "I Cram To Understand U (Sam)"	(4:39)

B-Side
 "Take It Lyte"	(2:47)

12" Vinyl

A-Side
 "I Cram To Understand U (Sam)" (Radio Version) (4:39)
 "I Cram To Understand U (Sam)" (Acapella) (3:54)

B-Side
 "I Cram To Understand U (Sam)" (Original) (4:39)
 "I Cram To Understand U (Sam)" (Dub) (4:05)
 "Take It Lyte" (2:47)

Personnel
Credits are taken from the liner notes and the official page of the ASCAP.
Written-By – Lana Moorer and Kirk Robinson
Producer – Audio Two
Mixed By – Daddy-O
Mastered By – CSB ♪♪ (Carlton Batts)
Executive-Producer – Nat Robinson

References

1988 songs
1988 singles
MC Lyte songs
Atlantic Records singles
Songs about drugs
Songs written by MC Lyte